The 2006–07 Georgia Tech Yellow Jackets men's basketball team represented the Georgia Institute of Technology in the 2006–07 college basketball season as a member of the Atlantic Coast Conference (ACC). The team was led by 7th-year head coach Paul Hewitt. Georgia Tech finished with a 20–12 record, and made the NCAA tournament, where they were defeated by UNLV.

Pre-season 
Paul Hewitt recruited one of the best recruiting classes in Georgia Tech history bringing in McDonald's All-Americans forward Thaddeus Young and guard Javaris Crittenton. The team returned Jeremis Smith, Anthony Morrow, Mario West, and Ra'Sean Dickey as strong and experienced veterans to add needed balance to a very age polarized squad.

Roster

Schedule and results

References

External links 
 Spread on the 2006-2007 Basketball teams in The Technique

Georgia Tech Yellow Jackets men's basketball seasons
Georgia Tech
Georgia Tech
Georgia Tech Yellow Jackets
Georgia Tech Yellow Jackets